Live on St. Patrick's Day from Boston, MA is a live album from Boston punk band Dropkick Murphys. It was recorded over three shows at the Avalon Ballroom in, as the name implies, Boston, Massachusetts, and was released on September 10, 2002.

Track list

References

Dropkick Murphys albums
2003 live albums
Hellcat Records live albums